This page list all the four squads which took part to the 1957 Rugby League World Cup.

Team photos
The Rugby League News published team photos of each country: Australia, France, Great Britain and New Zealand

Australia
Dick Poole was appointed Captain/Coach of the Australian team. Norman 'Latchem' Robinson was team manager. 
The squad was selected from four interstate matches played on 22, 25 May, June 4th and 8th, all of which were comfortably won by New South Wales (margins of 38, 17, 64 and 33). A second trial match was played on 8 June, between Metropolitan and Northern teams, from which Barnes, McCaffery and Schofield were selected in Australia's World Cup squad. 
Carlson, Davies, Watson and the unused Tyquin were selected from Queensland clubs. Hawick and Schofield were selected from clubs in New South Wales Country areas. The balance of the squad were playing for Sydney-based clubs during the 1957 season. 
Brian Carlson's contract as captain-coach of Blackall was terminated by that club due to his decision to participate in the World Cup tournament.

Squad members who did not play in the tournament.

France
The French team was coached by Jean Duhau and René Duffort and managed by Antoine Blain.

The Rugby League News included team lists for the matches against Great Britain and Australia.

At the conclusion of the tournament France played a match against Southern New South Wales in Wagga. They subsequently played a three match series against Great Britain in South Africa.

The French squad was:

Great Britain
The team was managed by Bill Fallowfield and Hector Elsworth Rawson, but no coach was appointed. The tean was captained by Alan Prescott, with Phil Jackson as vice-captain.

The Rugby League News published details of the touring team including each player's occupation, age, height and weight. The same Sydney-based match-day program publication included team lists for the matches against France and New Zealand. 
English representative Phil Jackson was born in Canada. Boston, Harris, Jones, Moses and Price were representatives from Wales, and Tom McKinney from Northern Ireland.
Prior to the commencement of the tournament, Great Britain played a match against Western Australia in Perth.

The following player was selected in the squad but did not play in the tournament.

New Zealand
The team was coached by Bill Telford (Auckland), with Keith Blow (Canterbury) as manager.

The Rugby League News published details of the touring team including each player's occupation, age, height and weight. The same publication included team lists for the match against Great Britain.

The following selected players did not play in the tournament.

Notes

External links
1957 Rugby League World Cup Squads rugbyleagueproject.org

Squads
Rugby League World Cup squads